Henry Herbert "Harp" McGuire (1921–1966) was an American actor who worked for a number of years in Australia, becoming very famous on Australian radio. He reached the height of his fame when he appeared as Randy Stone in the Australian adaptation of the NBC radio serial 'Night Beat' produced by Grace Gibson Radio Productions.

McGuire was a native of Nashville, Tennessee born on November 1, 1921. He worked in American film and TV productions such as "On the Beach" (1959), "The Twilight Zone" (1959) and the "Outlaws" (1960). He also played a gas station attendant on a segment of "Leave It To Beaver."

McGuire died in Los Angeles, California on October 21, 1966 after suffering from coronary sclerosis.

Filmography

References

External links

1921 births
1966 deaths
American expatriate male actors
American male voice actors
20th-century American male actors
American expatriates in Australia